was launched in Hamburg in 1790, probably under another name. She started sailing as a slave ship out of London in 1795. She made three voyages as a slave ship between 1795 and 1800. She then left that trade but a French privateer captured her late in 1800.
  was a French vessel that British owners purchased in 1802. She was lost in 1803 on a whaling office. She may have been the same vessel as the previous Defiance.

See also
 : the name one of twelve ships and two shore establishments of the Royal Navy
 : the name of three US Navy ships

Ship names or  Royal Navy ship names